Gourie Cave is a large river cave in Manchester Parish in west-central Jamaica. At 3505 meters it is the longest cave known in the island. It is susceptible to flooding.

See also
 List of caves in Jamaica
Jamaican Caves Organisation
Manchester Parish, Jamaica

External links
Aerial view.
Photos
Gourie Cave - Jamaican Caves Organisation

References

Caves of Jamaica
Geography of Manchester Parish
Caves of the Caribbean